The 2005 Toray Pan Pacific Open was a women's tennis tournament played on indoor carpet courts. It was the 22nd edition of the Toray Pan Pacific Open, and was part of the Tier I Series of the 2005 WTA Tour. It took place at the Tokyo Metropolitan Gymnasium in Tokyo, Japan, from January 28 through February 6, 2005. Maria Sharapova won the singles title.

Finals

Singles

 Maria Sharapova defeated  Lindsay Davenport, 6–1, 3–6, 7–6

Doubles

 Janette Husárová /  Elena Likhovtseva  defeated  Lindsay Davenport /   Corina Morariu, 6–4, 6–3

External links
Official website
Singles, Doubles and Qualifying Singles Draws

Toray Pan Pacific Open
Pan Pacific Open
Toray Pan Pacific Open
Toray Pan Pacific Open
Toray Pan Pacific Open
Toray Pan Pacific Open